James W. Huscroft (born January 9, 1967) is a Canadian former professional ice hockey defenceman who spent parts of ten seasons in the National Hockey League.

Playing career
Huscroft was born in Creston, British Columbia. A tough defensive defenceman, Huscroft accumulated almost 3,000 penalty minutes in his professional hockey career, including over 1,000 in the National Hockey League (NHL). While a slow skater and not possessing tremendous natural abilities, Huscroft succeeded in pro hockey due to his tremendous grit, work ethic, and perseverance. Though he was never more than a sixth or seventh defender on any team in the NHL, he was a consummate warrior and leader, and well respected by teammates and rivals alike.

Huscroft was originally drafted by the New Jersey Devils in the 1985 NHL Draft, and turned professional in 1987. He spent five years with New Jersey's top AHL affiliate in Utica, and also managed to appear in 65 NHL games for the Devils before moving to the Boston Bruins organization in 1992. He managed to crack Boston's NHL roster for good midway through the 1993–94 season, and stuck in the NHL for the next six seasons, also suiting up for the Calgary Flames, Tampa Bay Lightning, Vancouver Canucks, Phoenix Coyotes, and Washington Capitals. He finished his career in 2001 with 5 goals and 37 points in 352 career NHL games, along with 1,065 penalty minutes.

Huscroft was an assistant coach with the Spokane Chiefs in the Western Hockey League,  and currently works with HES, Hockey Educational Systems in Renton, Washington, instructing amateur ice hockey players of all levels and is the director of facilities for Sno-King Ice Arenas (Renton and Kirkland, Washington).

Career statistics

Regular season and playoffs

References

External links

Profile at legends of hockey.net

1967 births
Boston Bruins players
Calgary Flames players
Canadian ice hockey defencemen
Ice hockey people from British Columbia
New Jersey Devils draft picks
Living people
New Jersey Devils players
People from the Regional District of Central Kootenay
Phoenix Coyotes players
Portland Pirates players
Providence Bruins players
Seattle Breakers players
Seattle Thunderbirds players
Tampa Bay Lightning players
Utica Devils players
Vancouver Canucks players
Washington Capitals players